Manhunters was a three-part TV drama series that aired on BBC Two in the United Kingdom in 2005. It tells the story of three cases of man-eaters through the memoirs of those who hunted them and, in the case of the third episode, accidentally unleashed them on their community. The first tells the story of Jim Corbett, played by Jason Flemyng and the Man-Eating Leopard of Rudraprayag. The second tells the story of George Rushby and the Lions of Njombe, and the third tells the story of the Wolf of Gysinge.

Inaccuracies

"The Man-eating Leopard of Rudraprayag" episode heavily differs from Corbett's memoirs:

In the film, Corbett is shown as a bare-faced young man at the time. In reality, Corbett was a fifty-year-old with a moustache. In the film, when asked how they will find the leopard, Corbett says on two occasions that they will wait for it to kill again. In reality, Corbett said that was unacceptable.

The hunt for the leopard is featured as more of a subplot that always takes a back seat to the Ibbotson melodrama and the other two subplots in which Corbett builds fond friendships with the local pundit and an Indian boy named Sanji and whose scenes are usually quite short and rushed compared to the former.

In the film, the Indian boy Sanji accompanies Corbett and assists him while he is tracking a couple of times. In reality, Corbett always tracked and hunted alone (except with Ibbotson) after a learning experience with his first man-eater in 1907. This Indian boy's death by the leopard was the driving force that caused Corbett to use the gin trap in the film. In reality, Corbett first used the trap much earlier in the hunt and when a leopard (the wrong one) fell for it and he accidentally freed it, Corbett and Ibbotson tracked it down and Corbett shot it in the head. In the film, Corbett was sick at the time and killed it while it leaped at him, passing out right afterwards.

In the film, Corbett is shown fatally wounding the leopard after it had gravely injured the pundit, who was bringing him a rifle light, while running down a path in a thunderstorm. In reality, Corbett shot the leopard by torch light while sitting in a machan. The pundit was not only alive and well, but among the first to hear the shot and called out to Corbett for a status update about the leopard. Corbett, not wanting to scare away the possibly wounded leopard, did not answer, and the pundit quickly closed the door of his cottage.

References

External links
 

2005 British television series debuts
2005 British television series endings
2000s British drama television series
BBC television dramas
2000s British television miniseries
English-language television shows
Television series set in the 1920s
Television shows set in India